WTWW is a shortwave station located in Lebanon, Tennessee.

WTWW  broadcasts religious programming from LaPorte Church of Christ, a white-supremacist church with Christian Identity sympathies based in Colorado, carrying that church's Scriptures for America programming service. It is officially licensed to Leap of Faith, Inc. As of December 2022, WTWW has one working transmitter, that on 5.085 MHz, which operates during the evening hours.

Until 2022, WTWW had also carried an oldies/classic hits format operated by Ted Randall, who also appeared on several programs on the station, and his wife Holly on the 5.085 MHz and 9.94 MHz frequencies. WTWW went off-air November 10, 2022, with Randall taking the oldies format to WRMI; the station returned to the air sporadically in December solely carrying Scriptures for America. WTWW is licensed several other frequencies that are off-air.

History

WTWW, according to the FCC, was originally licensed a construction permit as WBWW on June 30, 2009. Testing began in January 2010 and ending mid-February 2010. Testing frequencies used were 5.755 MHz and 9.48 MHz, and recorded by several listeners who uploaded the audio to YouTube. WTWW broadcast with a heavily used transmitter, donated by KNLS after that station upgraded to news transmitters, throughout its existence.

WTWW officially signed on at 15:00 UTC on Friday, February 19, 2010 using the 9.48 MHz frequency with low power and streaming  with programming from the Scriptures for America broadcast network, part of a long-term leasing agreement that has continued throughout WTWW's existence. Both the frequencies 5.755 MHz and 9.48 MHz and their transmitters were previously used by Christian shortwave outlet KAIJ in Dallas, Texas.

In January 2010, WTWW (as WBWW) was licensed to operate at 100 kilowatts with an azimuth of 40 degrees, every day, on 5.755 MHz from 00:00 to 07:00 UTC and on 9.48 MHz from 12:00 to 19:00 and 22:00 to 24:00 UTC, targeting CIRAF zones 4 and 9 (eastern Canada), 18 and 27–28 (Europe), 37–38 (north Africa), 39 (the Middle East), and 46–47 (western and central Africa).

In 2015, WTWW briefly served as the terrestrial broadcast home of Art Bell's overnight radio program Midnight in the Desert.

The Big One on 5085

Until 2022, WTWW's lead engineer Ted Randall operated a locally originated personality oldies format on the 5085 kHz channel in the evenings, with veteran disc jockeys and voiceover artists to host the programming. WTWW disc jockeys worked unpaid for the station, broadcasting remotely from their homes.

Temporary shutdown and departure of The Big One
On November 9, 2022, Randall announced that The Big One would discontinue all shortwave operations, with intent to continue streaming the programming as long as it was feasible, initially stating that electricity and transmitter usage fees had risen to a point that the station could no longer realistically pay for them. Glenn Hauser noted that the 9.475 and 5.83 frequencies had disappeared several weeks beforehand, which all parties involved noted was because of neglect and disrepair at the transmitter site; Randall attempted to resolve the situation by moving the programming to the remaining usable frequencies and noted he had been unable to reach representatives of Scriptures for America for "over a year" before the events of November 9.

The Big One signed off for the last time the night of November 9, with its final programming including a farewell message from Randall encouraging listeners to continue listening to the webstream, a string of listener requests from WTWW's automated system, and the final song being a rendition of "America the Beautiful" by one of Randall's favorite recording artists, Ronnie Milsap. The station's format and online presence remained under Randall's ownership. Five days later, the WTWW webstream rebranded as "WRMI Legends" as they relocated to WRMI, as WRMI invited Ted Randall's programming and there was strong listener support to keep the programming on shortwave in some form. All local references to Nashville changed to those representing WRMI's home base in Miami. All references to Scriptures for America were removed from what had been the WTWW website (which was repurposed to serve the WRMI Legends programming), and Randall and other on-air personalities began describing their departure as a fly-by-night eviction due to "philosophical differences" with Leap of Faith Inc. (particularly the white-supremacist content on Scriptures for America that the station's hosts, who are more traditionally evangelical Christian, found abhorrent) in addition to the aforementioned financial situation.

George McClintock, chairman of the shell corporation that holds WTWW's license, indicated his intentions to bring the station back to the air with Scriptures for America (and no attempts to replace the music programming) after Randall's departure. After Scriptures for America brought its own engineers to the Tennessee transmitter site, WTWW sporadically returned to the air December 22, carrying Scriptures for America on the 5.085 frequency.

Programming
Scriptures for America operates primarily as an outlet for the pre-recorded sermons of LaPorte Church of Christ founder Peter J. Peters and his son-in-law and successor, Jonathan Friedrich.

LaPorte had also previously offered The Bible Worldwide, which offered audiobook broadcasts of the Holy Bible in various languages (with the King James Version being used for English readings), when WTWW had an additional frequency to spare.

References

External links
 Scriptures for America Worldwide Broadcast Network
 WRMI Legends — the former official WTWW Web site operated by the Randall group
 Main Station Record from the FCC International Broadcasting Bureau

TWW
Companies based in Nashville, Tennessee 
Radio stations established in 2010
Scott County, Tennessee
Shortwave radio stations in the United States
2010 establishments in Tennessee